ROKS Namwon (PCC-781) is a  of the Republic of Korea Navy.

Development and design 

The Pohang class is a series of corvettes built by different Korean shipbuilding companies. The class consists of 24 ships and some after decommissioning were sold or given to other countries. There are five different types of designs in the class from Flight II to Flight VI.

Construction and career 
Namwon was launched on 17 October 1989 by Daewoo Shipbuilding. The vessel was commissioned on 1 May 1990.

References
 

Ships built by Daewoo Shipbuilding & Marine Engineering
Pohang-class corvettes
1989 ships
Corvettes of the Cold War